The 2023 Incarnate Word Cardinals football team will represent the University of the Incarnate Word (UIW) as a member of the Southland Conference during the 2023 NCAA Division I FCS football season. The Cardinals play their home games at Gayle and Tom Benson Stadium in San Antonio, Texas. They are led by first-year head coach Clint Killough.

Previous season

The Cardinals finished the 2022 season with a 12–2 overall record, 5–1 in Southland play, to win a share of the Southland Conference championship, their third conference title. They received an at large bid, a first round bye and the number 7 overall seed in the FCS Playoffs, where they defeated Furman in the second round, No. 2 seeded Sacramento State in the quarterfinals, and lost to No. 3 seeded North Dakota State in the semifinals.

Preseason

Preseason poll

Schedule

Personnel

Coaching staff
Source:

Roster
Source:

Game summaries

@ UTEP

@ Northern Colorado

@ Abilene Christian

North American

Southeastern Louisiana

Texas A&M–Commerce

@ McNeese

@ Lamar

Nicholls

Northwestern State

@ Houston Christian

References

Incarnate Word
Incarnate Word Cardinals football seasons
Incarnate Word Cardinals football